The 2015–16 Rugby Pro D2 was the second-level French rugby union club competition, behind the Top 14, for the 2015–16 season. It ran alongside the 2015–16 Top 14 competition; both competitions are operated by the Ligue Nationale de Rugby (LNR).

Teams

Changes in the lineup from 2014–15 were:
 Pau won the 2014–15 Pro D2 title and were thereby automatically promoted to the Top 14. Agen won the promotion playoffs to secure the second promotion place.
 The bottom finisher in 2014–15, Massy was relegated from Pro D2 to Fédérale 1. 
 The two bottom finishers in the 2014–15 Top 14 season, Bayonne and Lyon OU, were relegated to Pro D2.
 The Fédérale 1 champion Provence Rugby earned promotion.

Competition format
The top team at the end of the regular season (after all the teams played one another twice, once at home, once away), is declared champion and earns a spot in the next Top 14 season. Teams ranked second to fifth compete in promotion playoffs, with the semifinals being played at the home ground of the higher-ranked team. The final is then played on neutral ground, and the winner earns the second ticket to the next Top 14.

The LNR uses a slightly different bonus points system from that used in most other rugby competitions. It trialled a new system in 2007–08 explicitly designed to prevent a losing team from earning more than one bonus point in a match, a system that also made it impossible for either team to earn a bonus point in a drawn match. LNR chose to continue with this system for subsequent seasons.

France's bonus point system operates as follows:

 4 points for a win.
 2 points for a draw.
 1 bonus point for winning while scoring at least 3 more tries than the opponent. This replaces the standard bonus point for scoring 4 tries regardless of the match result.
 1 bonus point for losing by 5 points (or less). This is a change from previous seasons, in which the margin was 7 points or less.

Table

Relegation
Normally, the teams that finish in 15th and 16th places in the table are relegated to Fédérale 1 at the end of the season.  In certain circumstances, "financial reasons" may cause a higher-placed team to be demoted instead, or prevent one of the two finalists in Fédérale 1 from promotion.

This season saw an example of the latter situation. Following the 2015–16 season, 15th-place Dax was spared relegation after Pro D2 side Tarbes was relegated due to excessive debt and failed in an appeal of the decision.

Play–offs
The highest ranked team at the end of the regular season, Lyon OU, earned automatic promotion to the Top 14 as champion de France de PRO D2 2016.

Semi–finals
The semi–finals followed a 2 v 5, 3 v 4 system, with the higher ranked team playing at home.

 Under LNR rules, if a playoff match ends level after full-time, the first tiebreaker is try count. Agen advanced with 4 tries to Perpignan's 2.

Final
The winners of the semi–finals played off for the second promotion spot to the Top 14.

See also
2015–16 Top 14 season

References

External links
  Ligue Nationale de Rugby – Official website
  Midi Olympique

2015–16
Pro D2